Stigmella kurokoi is a moth of the family Nepticulidae. It is only known from Japan (Kyushu and Hokkaido) and Russia (Primorskiy Kray), but is probably also present in China.

The larvae feed on Quercus dentata. They mine the leaves of their host plant. The mine consists of a linear gallery.

External links
Nepticulidae (Lepidoptera) in China, 1. Introduction and Stigmella (Schrank) feeding on Fagaceae

Nepticulidae
Moths of Asia
Moths described in 1984